Pajonal is a corregimiento in Penonomé District, Coclé Province, Panama with a population of 13,565 as of 2010. Its population as of 1990 was 10,232; its population as of 2000 was 12,097.

References

Corregimientos of Coclé Province